DCMA may refer to:

 DCMA Collective, a US "lifestyle brand" clothing company
 DCMA syndrome, dilated cardiomyopathy with ataxia
 DC Metro Area, the region including Washington, DC, United States
 Defense Contract Management Agency, a U.S. agency
 Dhow Countries Music Academy, Zanzibar, Tanzania
 Don't Call Me Angel, a 2019 song by Ariana Grande, Miley Cyrus, and Lana Del Rey
 Dual channel memory architecture
 Durham Colliery Mechanics' Association, a former British trade union

See also 
 Digital Millennium Copyright Act (DMCA)